Jon Gomez Garai (born May 17, 1990) is a Spanish singer, musician and TV presenter.

He made his debut at the age of nineteen in Betizu on the ETB 1 channel, being one of several Betizu artists (a former Betizu Star).

Early life 
Jon Gomez was born in 1990, in Galdakao, Biscay, Basque Country (Spain).

Career 

He studied the Bachelor's degree in journalism in the University of the Basque Country.

He began as a television presenter in 2009 on the Hamaika Telebista network in the Gaztero program. But he did not stay long, as he started working for EITB Media. At the age of nineteen, he began as a presenter of Betizu, succeeding Nerea Alias. His participation and roles in Betizu brought him acclaimed success and made him a child star in the Basque Country, becaming well known among the children and the audience.

In 2010 he was the presenter of various contests, including a national cooking contest with chef David de Jorge. In addition to that, he has also been a presenter of the famous television program El conquistador del fin del mundo in ETB 2 channel.

In 2011 he was the presenter of his own television program called IBIL2D on the ETB 1 channel, becoming the youngest presenter in the history of EITB.

Between 2015 and 2016, he was the presenter and director of the first sex education program on Basque television, SexSua.

Currently he is also a member, musician and vocalist of the Basque music group Oxabi.

Private life 
He lives in Bilbao.

Filmography

Television 

 2009, Gaztero, Hamaika Telebista (presenter)
 2010, Betizu, ETB 1 (presenter, actor)
 2011, IBIL2D, ETB 1 (presenter)
 2015, SexSUA, ETB 1 (presenter)
 2018, El conquistador del fin del mundo, ETB 2 (presenter)

See also 

 Betizu
 Betizu Taldea
 Egin kantu!
 Nerea Alias
 Elene Arandia
 Jon Urbieta

References

External links 

 

1990 births
Living people
People from Galdakao
University of the Basque Country alumni
Spanish child actors
Spanish television presenters